Events from the year 1816 in Ireland.

Events
 The Year Without a Summer – famine and typhoid kill 65,000 people by 1819.
 January – Belfast Savings Bank opens for business.
 30 January – wrecking of the Sea Horse, Boadicea and Lord Melville (military transport ships) off Tramore in a gale with the loss of over 500 persons.
 17 March – Richmond Bridge, designed by James Savage, is opened over Dublin's River Liffey.
 May – the Ha'penny Bridge is opened over Dublin's River Liffey.
 18 May – the National Institution for the Education of Deaf and Dumb Children of the Poor in Ireland is founded.
 June – St. George's Church, Belfast, is opened, the oldest in the city built for the United Church of England and Ireland.
 29–30 October – Wildgoose Lodge Murders: eight people are burned to death by a gang in County Louth.
 Templemore Market House is built in County Tipperary.

Births
6 February – John Joseph Lynch, Bishop of Toronto (died 1888).
1 March – Charles Magill, member of the 1st Canadian Parliament and mayor of Hamilton (died 1898).
14 March – Anthony O'Grady Lefroy, government official in Western Australia (died 1897).
8 April – Frederick William Burton, painter (died 1900).
12 April – Charles Gavan Duffy, nationalist and Australian colonial politician (died 1903).
31 July – Trevor Chute, British Army officer (died 1886).
17 September – John Hawkins Hagarty, lawyer, teacher and judge in Canada (died 1900).
30 October – Richard Quain, physician (died 1898).
Full date unknown
John Drummond, early settler and explorer in Western Australia, first Inspector of Native Police there (died 1906).
John O'Mahony, a founding member of the Fenian Brotherhood (died 1877).

Deaths
24 April – James Orr, rhyming weaver poet (born 1770).
3 May – James McHenry, signer of the United States Constitution from Maryland, third United States Secretary of War (born 1753).
7 July – Richard Brinsley Sheridan, playwright and statesman (born 1751).
Full date unknown
Robert Fagan, painter, diplomat and archaeologist (b. c1761).

References

 
Years of the 19th century in Ireland
1810s in Ireland
Ireland
 Ireland